Down the Road Wherever Tour was a 2019 concert tour by British singer-songwriter and guitarist Mark Knopfler, promoting the release of his album Down the Road Wherever. The tour started on 25 April 2019 in Barcelona, Spain, included 86 concerts in two legs, and ended on 25 September 2019 in New York City, New York in the United States. Paul Sexton from UDiscoverMusic described the London show as having, "...little to do with overt showmanship and everything to do with exhilarating interaction with his bandmates."

Setlist 
This set list is representative of the tour's average setlist as conducted by Setlist.fm, which represents all concerts for the duration of the tour.

 Why Aye Man
 Corned Beef City
 Sailing to Philadelphia
 Once Upon a Time in the West (Dire Straits song)
 Romeo and Juliet (Dire Straits song)
 My Bacon Roll
 Matchstick Man
 Done with Bonaparte
 Heart Full of Holes
 Your Latest Trick (Dire Straits song)
 Postcards from Paraguay
 On Every Street (Dire Straits song)
 Speedway at Nazareth

Encore:
 Money for Nothing (Dire Straits song)

Encore 2:
 Going Home: Theme of the Local Hero

Tour dates

Recording
Every show from the tour was recorded and later released as .flac or .mp3 record at Mark's Website

Personnel
 Mark Knopfler - guitar, vocals
 Richard Bennett - guitar
 Guy Fletcher - keyboard, guitar
 Jim Cox - keyboards
 Ian Thomas - drums
 Glenn Worf - bass
 Danny Cummings - percussion
 Nigel Hitchcock - tenor saxophone
 Tom Walsh - trumpet
 Trevor Mires - trombone
 John Mccusker - fiddle, violin
 Mike McGoldrick - whistle
 Robbie McIntosh - guitar

Notes

References

2019 concert tours
Mark Knopfler concert tours